McCumber is a surname. Notable people with the surname include:

Mark McCumber (born 1951), American golfer
Porter J. McCumber (1858–1933), American politician

See also
Lester McCumbers (born 1921), American fiddler
Fordney–McCumber Tariff
McCumber cube
McCumber relation